Donges is a commune in the Loire-Atlantique department in the region of Pays de la Loire, France.

Population

See also
Communes of the Loire-Atlantique department
Parc naturel régional de Brière
André Bizette-Lindet

References

Communes of Loire-Atlantique